Lucena Lines Inc. (LLI), is a subsidiary of JAC Liner Inc. and commenced its own operations back in December 2004. It has operations from Manila to Lucena,  Mauban and Santa Cruz in the province of Quezon, Laguna and Marinduque.

History 

JAC Liner started in April 1987 as a sole proprietorship operating two second hand buses along Alabang - Fairview route. The owner's family backyard lot was then became the company's repair shop and head office.

When the company were assisted by a Bus Installment Purchase Program (BIPP) in 1988, it gave their way purchase 26 brand new buses and was granted to have additional franchises along EDSA. They later expand their operations to the Southern Tagalog, where it immediately established itself as one of the largest bus company in the country.

In December 2004, they establish their own affiliate company Lucena Lines Inc. Named after the city of Lucena, the capital of Quezon province, they establish operations connecting from Manila to Lucena, and all the way to the province of Marinduque with the help of a shipping company, Montenegro Shipping Lines.

In 2011, JAC Liner along with Lucena Lines makes the first bus company in the country to offer free Wi-Fi on board service through the help of Philippine Long Distance Telephone Company (PLDT).

Along with JAC Liner, Lucena Lines grew and became one of the predominant bus liner in Luzon. As of 2015, the parent, JAC Liner is now the largest bus company in the country in terms of fleet size.

Absorption from former subsidiaries 
Lucena Lines now absorbs some bus companies which once bought by JAC Liner and became JAC's subsidiary. However, it soon went to dissolve having JAC Liner in control. The buses from these former subsidiaries are now managed and repainted under the name of Lucena Lines. They were:
 Green Star Express Inc.
 Laguna Express Inc.

Fleet 

Lucena Lines runs ordinary and air conditioned bus units. Recently, the company has started to offer deluxe trips as well. Majority of their buses are made from Yutong.
 MAN 16.290 Lion Star
 Hino buses:
-Hino RK1J-ST bodied by Pilipinas Hino Inc (now Hino Motors Philippines Corp.) and some of their coach bodies (facelifted to Santarosa 620 NV fascia) modified by ABTii
 Yutong ZK6100H
 Yutong ZK6107HA
 Yutong ZK6122HD9
 King Long XMQ6118JB
Former bus fleets:
 Del Monte Euro MAN 16.290
 Isuzu FTR (PABFTR33PL) rebodied in Santarosa NV 620 Body
 NDPC Euro Nissan Diesel
 Nissan Diesel RB46S
 Nissan Diesel Santarosa NV 620
 Nissan Diesel SP215NSB

Branding, and Livery 

Lucena Lines at its introduction used to have red, yellow and white stripes livery with Popeye as their identical logo. Like PARTAS that uses Roadrunner as their corporate logo and branding, their parent JAC Liner pay the rights in using Popeye as Lucena Lines' corporate logo and branding to the owner, Warner Brothers. However, in 2010, the Popeye logo wasn't used anymore and all Lucena Lines units were updated to its red, yellow and white spherical livery.

In 2016, the name Lucena Lines were re-branded as "LLI" and use the JAC Liner logo for their livery. With the simplified name, riders often dubbed them as "Lu Li".

Bus Terminals

Metro Manila 

They have three bus terminals in Metro Manila which are all under JAC Liner, to wit:
Araneta City Bus Port Cubao, Quezon City
EDSA Cubao, Quezon City
JAC Liner Kamias Terminal, Quezon City
JAC Liner Buendia Terminal, Buendia Avenue, Pasay

Provincial 

Lucena Lines has operations to two bus terminals where JAC Liner is also at present, to wit:
Lucena Grand Central Terminal, Brgy. Ilayang Dupay, Lucena City, Quezon
Brgy. Polo, Mauban, Quezon
Pagsanjan, Laguna

Routes 

 Kamias - Lucena
 Buendia - Lucena
 PITX - Lucena
 Alabang - Lucena
 Southwoods Biñan - Lucena
 Ayala - Pacita
 Ayala - Biñan
 Ayala - Southwoods Biñan
 PITX - Santa Cruz
 Buendia - Santa Cruz
 Buendia - Calamba
 Kamias - Calamba
 Kamias - Santa Cruz

Destinations 

Their routes as of 2016 with exclusion to their services within Metro Manila:

With the under management of JAC Liner, Lucena Lines uses the terminals of JAC Liner in Buendia, Pasay, Kamias Quezon City and Grand Central Terminal in Lucena City

Metro Manila
 Kamias, Quezon City
 Araneta Center Bus Terminal, Cubao, Quezon City
 Buendia, Pasay
 Alabang, Muntinlupa
Provincial Destinations
 Calamba, Laguna
 Bay, Laguna
 Los Baños, Laguna
 Santa Cruz, Laguna
 Victoria, Laguna
 Candelaria, Quezon
 Lucena City, Quezon
 Mauban, Quezon
 San Pedro, Laguna

See also 
 Dagupan Bus Co., Inc.
 Fermina Express
 JAC Liner
 Pangasinan Solid North Transit Inc.
 List of bus companies of the Philippines

References 

Bus companies of the Philippines
Transportation in Luzon
Transportation in Quezon
Companies based in Pasay